Płonna may refer to the following places in Poland:
Płonna, Podkarpackie Voivodeship (south-east Poland)
Płonna, Masovian Voivodeship (east-central Poland)